Ragatinus maddisoni is the first jumping spider species in the genus Ragatinus. It was first identified in 2016 and lives in Kenya.

References

Endemic fauna of Kenya
Fauna of Kenya
Salticidae
Spiders described in 2016
Spiders of Africa
Taxa named by Wanda Wesołowska